Marek Stebnicki (born 11 November 1965) is a Polish former ice hockey player. He played for Polonia Bytom, Krefeld Pinguine, Revierlöwen Oberhausen, GKS Katowice, and Unia Oświęcim during his career. He won the Polish league championship in eight times during his career, six with Polonia and two with Unia. Stebnicki also played for the Polish national team at the 1988 Winter Olympics and several World Championships.

References

External links
 

1965 births
Living people
GKS Katowice (ice hockey) players
Ice hockey players at the 1988 Winter Olympics
Krefeld Pinguine players
Olympic ice hockey players of Poland
People from Dynów
Sportspeople from Podkarpackie Voivodeship
Polish ice hockey centres
Revier Löwen players
TH Unia Oświęcim players
TMH Polonia Bytom players